The following is a partial list of the "A" codes for Medical Subject Headings (MeSH), as defined by the United States National Library of Medicine (NLM).

This list continues the information at List of MeSH codes (A01). Codes following these are found at List of MeSH codes (A03). For other MeSH codes, see List of MeSH codes.

The source for this content is the set of 2006 MeSH Trees from the NLM.

– musculoskeletal system

– aponeurosis

– cartilage

– elastic cartilage
  – ear cartilages
  – laryngeal cartilages
  – arytenoid cartilage
  – cricoid cartilage
  – epiglottis
  – thyroid cartilage

– fibrocartilage
  – intervertebral disc
  – annulus fibrosus
  – nucleus fibrosus
  – meniscus
  – tibial menisci
  – palmar plate
  – plantar plate
  – triangular fibrocartilage

– hyaline cartilage
  – articular cartilage
  – costal cartilage
  – laryngeal cartilages
  – arytenoid cartilage
  – cricoid cartilage
  – epiglottis
  – thyroid cartilage
  – nasal cartilages

– fascia

– fascia lata

– tenon capsule

– ligaments

– broad ligament

– articular ligament
  – anterior cruciate ligament
  – collateral ligament
  – ulnar collateral ligament
  – lateral ligament, ankle
  – knee medial collateral ligament
  – ligamentum flavum
  – longitudinal ligaments
  – patellar ligament
  – plantar plate
  – posterior cruciate ligament
  – round ligament of femur

– round ligament
 – femur round ligament
 – liver round ligament
 – uteri round ligament

– muscles

– skeletal muscle
 – abdominal muscles
 – abdominal oblique muscles
 – pelvic floor
 – rectus abdominis
 – back muscles
 – intermediate back muscles
 – paraspinal muscles
 – superficial back muscles
 – deltoid muscle
 – facial muscles
 – gracilis muscle
 – hamstring muscles
 – laryngeal muscles
 – masticatory muscles
 – masseter muscle
 – pterygoid muscles
 – temporal muscle
 – neck muscles
 – oculomotor muscles
 – palatal muscles
 – pectoralis muscles
 – pharyngeal muscles
 – upper esophageal sphincter
 – velopharyngeal sphincter
 – pasoas muscles
 – quadriceps muscle
 – respiratory muscles
 – diaphragm
 – intercostal muscles
 – rotator cuff
 – stapedius
 – tensor tympani

– smooth muscle 
 – lower esophageal sphincter
 – smooth vascular muscle
 – myometrium

– myocardium
 – papillary muscles

– skeleton

– bone and bones
 – bone-impact interface
 – bones of lower extremity
 – femur
 – femur head
 – femur neck
 – foot bones
 – metatarsal bones
 – tarsal bones
 – calcaneus
 – talus
 – toe phalanges
 – leg bones
 – fibula
 – patella
 – tibia
 – pelvic bones
 – acetabulum
 – ilium
 – ischium
 – public bone
 – bones of upper extremity
 – arm bones
 – humerus
 – humeral head
 – radius
 – ulna
 – olecranon process
 – clavicle
 – hand bones
 – carpal bones
 – capitate bone
 – hamate bone
 – lunate bone
 – pisiform bone
 – scaphoid bone
 – trapezium bone
 – trapezoid bone
 – triquetrum bone
 – finger phalanges
 – metacarpal bones
 – scapula
 – acromion
 – coracoid process
 – glenoid cavity
 – diaphyses
 – epiphyses
 – growth plate
 – hyoid bones
 – rib cage
 – ribs
 – cervical rib
 – sternum
 – manubrium
 – xiphoid bone
 – sesamoid bones
 – patella
 – skull
 – cranial fontanelles
 – cranial sutures
 – ethmoid bone
 – facial bones
 – jaw
 – alveolar process
 – tooth socket
 – dental arch
 – mandible
 – chin
 – mandibular canal
 – mandibular condyle
 – mental foramen
 – maxilla
 – hard palate
 – nasal bone
 – orbit
 – turbinates
 – vomer
 – zygoma
 – frontal bone
 – occipital bone
 – foramen magnum
 – parietal bone
 – pterygopalatine fossa
 – skull base
 – anterior cranial fossa
 – middle cranial fossa
 – posterior cranial fossa
 – jugular foramina
 – infratemporal fossa
 – parapharyngeal space
 – sphenoid bone
 – sella turcica
 – temporal bone
 – mastoid
 – petrous bone
 – spine
 – cervical vertebrae
 – cervical vertebra axis
 – odontoid process
 – cervical atlas
 – coccyx
 – intervertebral disc
 – annulus fibrosus
 – nucleus pulposus
 – lumbar vertebrae
 – sacrum
 – spinal canal
 – epidural space
 – thoracic vertebrae
 – vetebral body

– joints
 – acromioclavicular joint
 – atlanto-axial joint
 – atlanto-occipital joint
 – synovial bursa
 – articular cartilage
 – elbow joint
 – foot joints
 – ankle joint
 – metatarsophalangeal joint
 – plantar plate
 – tarsal joints
 – subtalar joint
 – toe joint
 – plantar plate
 – hand joints
 – carpal joints
 – carpometacarpal joints
 – finger joint
 – metacarpophalangeal joint
 – palmar plate
 – wrist joint
 – triangular fibrocartilage
 – hip joint
 – round ligament of femur
 – joint capsule
 – synovial membrane
 – synovial fluid
 – knee joint
 – tibial menisci
 – patellofemoral joint
 – articular ligaments
 – anterior cruciate ligament
 – collateral ligaments
 – ulnar collateral liagment
 – ankle lateral liagment
 – knee medial collateral liagment
 – ligamentum flavum
 – longitudinal ligaments
 – palmar plate
 – patellar liagment
 – plantar plate
 – posterior cruciate liagment
 – round ligament of femur
 – pubic symphysis
 – sacroiliac joint
 – shoulder joint
 – sternoclavicular joint
 – sternocostal joints
 – temporomandibular joint
 – temporomandibular joint disc
 – zygapophyseal joint

– tendons

– achilles tendon

– hamstring tendons

– patellar ligament

– rotator cuff

The list continues at List of MeSH codes (A03).

A02